The Goldenacre Sports Ground is located in the Goldenacre area of Edinburgh, Scotland. It is owned by the George Heriot's School. Several sports are played here including cricket, association football, tennis, and rugby. It is also the home ground of Heriot's Rugby Club and Heriot's Cricket Club.

The cricket pitch hosted seven matches (two of which are warm ups) for the 2015 ICC World Twenty20 Qualifier.

In the film Chariots of Fire, the Scotland v France International Athletics competition scene was shot at Goldenacre.

References

External links

Cricket grounds in Scotland
Sports venues in Edinburgh
Listed sports venues in Scotland
Rugby union stadiums in Scotland